Macéo Capietto (born 12 January 2006) is a French racing driver competing in the Formula Regional European Championship with Race Performance Motorsport.

Early and personal life 
Born in Montereau and based in Veneux-les-Sablons, Capietto has spent all his life in the Île-de-France, the most populous region of France. He is the son of Prema Racing team manager and former karting driver Guillaume Capietto.

Career

Karting 
Following in the footsteps of his father, Capietto started competing in karting from a very young age. After spending three seasons in Minikart in which he became the regional Île-de-France champion, he moved onto the international scene in 2018 and was briefly coached by Anthoine Hubert. He came runner-up to Esteban Masson in the 2019 French Junior Karting Championship, and in his last year of karting, driving for Giorgio Pantano's team, was a podium finisher in the WSK Euro Series.

Formula 4 
In 2021 Capietto joined the French F4 Championship to make his single-seater debut. Despite his inexperience, he achieved his first F4 victory in only his fourth race at the Magny-Cours circuit. Taking three more wins across the season but never actually leading the championship, Capietto entered the season finale only four points behind title rival Esteban Masson. The pair ended up coming together in controversial fashion in the final race: pole-sitting Masson remained in the lead of the race and the standings until the last lap, when Capietto, in a last-gasp attempt at an overtake, collided with Masson, putting him out of the race and provisionally handing Capietto the title. However, following an investigation by the race stewards, Capietto was later disqualified from all results of that weekend and thus stripped of the title. He ended up 3rd in the standings, behind champion Masson and Hugh Barter.

In late 2021 Capietto also made two appearances in the Italian F4 Championship with his father's Prema Powerteam. He scored two points in the final round of the season at Monza.

Formula Regional

2022 
After testing for several teams during the winter, Capietto moved into the Formula Regional European Championship in 2022, partnering Pietro Armanni and Cenyu Han at Monolite Racing.

2023 
Capietto switched to Race Performance Motorsport for the 2023 Formula Regional European Championship.

Karting record

Karting career summary

Complete CIK-FIA Karting European Championship results 
(key) (Races in bold indicate pole position) (Races in italics indicate fastest lap)

Racing record

Racing career summary 

* Season still in progress.

Complete French F4 Championship results 
(key) (Races in bold indicate pole position) (Races in italics indicate fastest lap)

Complete Italian F4 Championship results 
(key) (Races in bold indicate pole position) (Races in italics indicate fastest lap)

Complete Formula Regional European Championship results 
(key) (Races in bold indicate pole position) (Races in italics indicate fastest lap)

* Season still in progress.

References

External links 
 

2006 births
Living people
French racing drivers
French F4 Championship drivers
Italian F4 Championship drivers
Prema Powerteam drivers
Formula Regional European Championship drivers
Monolite Racing drivers
Karting World Championship drivers